Ossolin  is a village in the administrative district of Gmina Klimontów, within Sandomierz County, Świętokrzyskie Voivodeship, in south-central Poland.

The village has a population of 180.

See also
 The Lesser Polish Way

References

External links
 County website

Villages in Sandomierz County
Ossoliński family